Ray Bowles (born Raymond Paul Bowles; January 16, 1975 in Massachusetts, United States) is a singer, best known for his work with the progressive rock band, Tristan Park.

Career
Ray started off his musical career with small local progressive and mainstream rock and metal bands, on lead vocals and rhythm guitar. He joined Tristan Park in 1993. The band already had a following and several studio albums with singer Chuck Dyac when Ray joined. In 1995, the band went on their first European tour with fellow prog rockers Grey Lady Down.

Discography

Tristan Park
A Place Inside – 1995
Leave to Enter – 1997
Looking Homeward – 1998

Solo

External links
Official home page

1975 births
Living people
American heavy metal singers
21st-century American singers